Spencers Wharf (also, Town Point and Hopewell) is an unincorporated community in St. Mary's County, Maryland, United States. It lies at an elevation of 13 feet (4 m).

References

Unincorporated communities in St. Mary's County, Maryland
Unincorporated communities in Maryland